Greenlawn Methodist Church and Cemetery, also known as Scobee Chapel and Greenlawn Memorial Chapel, is a historic Methodist church and cemetery located near Perry, Ralls County, Missouri.  The church was built about 1883, and is a one-story, rectangular frame building on a stone pier foundation. It measures 26 feet, 6 inches, by 40 feet, 6 inches, has a gable front, and is sheathed in clapboard siding.  The cemetery contains 196 graves with stones dating from 1883 to the present.

It was listed on the National Register of Historic Places in 2007.

References

External links
 
 
 

Methodist churches in Missouri
Churches on the National Register of Historic Places in Missouri
Cemeteries on the National Register of Historic Places in Missouri
Churches completed in 1883
1883 establishments in Missouri
Churches in Ralls County, Missouri
National Register of Historic Places in Ralls County, Missouri